Apologies Are for the Weak is the debut studio album by American metalcore band Miss May I, and is their only album with bassist and clean vocalist Josh Gillespie.  The album reached number 29 on Billboard's Top Heatseekers, and number 66 on Top Independent Albums.

Post-release
The album sold well over 25,000 copies in one year. Music videos were made for two of the songs, "Architect" and "Forgive and Forget". The album's title track was featured in the 2011 video game Saints Row: The Third.

Apologies Are for the Weak is also the only release by the band to include bassist and clean vocalist Josh Gillespie. After this album, Gillespie would depart from the band which had original bass player, Ryan Neff rejoin Miss May I.

Music videos
The video for "Forgive and Forget" was the first music video released from the album. Previous to this album, Miss May I had a music video produced for their song "Architect" from their demo tape Demo 2008 (before the band was signed to Rise).

Track listing

Personnel
Miss May I
 Levi Benton – lead vocals, lyrics
 B.J. Stead – lead guitar
 Josh Gillespie – bass, clean vocals
 Justin Aufdemkampe – rhythm guitar
 Jerod Boyd – drums

Production
 Joey Sturgis – producer, engineering, mixing and (on tracks 1 and 3) mastering, additional composition
 Dan Mumford – artwork, design

References

2009 debut albums
Miss May I albums
Rise Records albums
Albums produced by Joey Sturgis